Pacific FC may refer to:

 Pacific FC, a Canadian soccer team
 Pacific F.C. (Mexico), a Mexican soccer team